Bolor-Erdene Khaltar (born August 15, 1975, in Ulaanbaatar, Mongolia) is a Mongolian author and journalist. She studied at the National University of Mongolia during 1995 and graduated from the journalism department of the College of Literature in 2000.

After graduation she started working at  newspapers such as "Public Law", "Today", "The Word", "News of the Century" and the agency "Irmuun". She is a freelance journalist and writer.

She received the top literary prize of Mongolia "The Golden Feather" in 2009, with her book entitled You and me (psychological stories) and was then awarded for her book Khishigt for children in 2011. In 2019, her novella for youth Khishigt was published in France with the revised title Khishigt Mongol.

Works

Story books 
The naked night (2002) 
Made in heart (2004) 
The paradise prisoners (2007) 
You and me (2009), (2013)
Bolor stories (2020)

Works for children 
The Mongolian old stories 1-10 (2008)
The wise queens story (2011) story
Two Temuujin /2011/ story
Red man /2011/ story
Mother's story

Novellas 
I love you - 2 (2009) 
Bad man (2010) 
Twenty years later (2010) 
Khishigt (2011), (2012), (2013), (2018) documentary novella.
“Bolor novellas” (2013)

Romans 
The running woman (2019)

Screenplays 
I love you-2 (2009)
Mi-15 (2010)
The color of Sun (2012)
The living partner (2014)

Letters 
The letter to my daughter's future love 
The letter to my son's future love

Lyrics 
Do not cry girl; singer Ariunaa T. 
I love you mom; drama song, singer Ariunaa T. 
Stranger lady; film song, singer Ariunaa T. 
The last song of swan; film song, singer Ariunaa T. 
The love color; singer Ariunaa T. 
Love to be loved; singer Sarantuya B.
I love that man; drama song, Evolution production.
The park couple; drama song, singer Tselmuun Ch.
You did not leave me;  singer Tuul D.
I changed; Gala band.
Mi-15; film song, singer Iderjavhlan P.
Loving times; singer Bayartsetseg B.
At the cross; singer Bayartsetseg B.
Thought; singer Bayartsetseg B.
Anna Karenina; drama song, singer Maraljingoo 
Draw me; singer Bayartsetseg B.

References

1975 births
Living people
Mongolian journalists
National University of Mongolia alumni
Mongolian women journalists